The 1936 UCI Track Cycling World Championships were the World Championship for track cycling. They took place in Zürich, Switzerland from 28 August to 6 September 1936. Three events for men were contested, two for professionals and one for amateurs.

Medal summary

Medal table

See also
 1936 UCI Road World Championships

References

Track cycling
UCI Track Cycling World Championships by year
International cycle races hosted by Switzerland
Sport in Zürich
1936 in track cycling
20th century in Zürich